Peter Friedman (born April 24, 1949) is an American stage, film, and television actor.

Life and career
Born in New York City, Friedman graduated from Hofstra University before making his Broadway debut in The Great God Brown in 1972. Friedman is Jewish.

Theatre
Friedman has appeared in thirteen Broadway productions, starting in 1972 with a revival of The Great God Brown. He appeared in a Broadway revival of The Visit in 1973, as the Carpenter. He appeared in Piaf in 1981 on Broadway, and A Soldier's Play Off-Broadway, also in 1981.

He played the role of Humphrey Taylor in the Off-Broadway production of The Common Pursuit, from October 1986 to August 1987, receiving a nomination for the Drama Desk Award, Outstanding Featured Actor in a Play. In his review for The New York Times, Frank Rich commented "The always impressive Mr. Friedman, as the embittered Wagnerian...allow us to empathize with characters who might otherwise be merely obnoxious or colorless."

He appeared in both the Off-Broadway and Broadway productions of The Heidi Chronicles in 1988 and 1989 in the role of Scoop Rosenbaum. He received a nomination for the Drama Desk Award for Outstanding Actor in a Play for The Heidi Chronicles.

He appeared Off-Broadway in the Manhattan Theatre Club production of the Donald Margulies play The Loman Family Picnic, from October 1993 to January 1994. The Best Plays of 1993-1994 commented "...Friedman inverting his usual dynamism to play the beleaguered father..."

He played the role of Jewish immigrant "Tateh" in the musical Ragtime in the pre-Broadway tryout (1996) and on Broadway (1998). He was nominated for the 1998 Tony Award for Best Performance by a Leading Actor in a Musical and the Drama Desk Award for Outstanding Actor in a Musical  for his role in Ragtime.

He appeared on Broadway in the Roundabout Theatre Company production of Twelve Angry Men from October 2004 to March 2005. For his role as "Frank" in Body Awareness, which ran Off-Broadway in 2008, Friedman received a nomination for the Drama Desk Award, Outstanding Featured Actor in a Play. The talkinbroadway.com reviewer noted that "...Friedman milks Frank’s own self-imposed, question-mark callousness for all it’s worth." He appeared in the Williamstown Theatre Festival production of Amy Herzog's After the Revolution in July and August 2010 as "Ben", and reprised his role in the Off-Broadway production at Playwrights Horizons from October to November 2010. The New York Times reviewer wrote: "Mr. Friedman burrows deeply into Ben’s anguish at being cut off by the daughter he raised to carry on the family tradition, the wound smarting all the more because he knows his own mistakes have caused the fissure."

He played the role of "Doug" in the Off-Broadway play The Great God Pan from December 2012 to January 2013, and received a nomination for the Drama Desk Award for Outstanding Featured Actor in a Play. The New York Times reviewer commented: "The recollections of his parents, small roles incisively portrayed by the reliable Becky Ann Baker and Peter Friedman..." From August 2013 to September 2013 he played the role of "Meckel" in the Off-Broadway production (and New York premiere) of Lauren Yee's The Hatmaker's Wife. Ben Brantley, in his review for The New York Times wrote: "Mr. Friedman brings unblushing good will and vivacity to assignments that include walking around with a clothespin on his nose..."

He appeared Off-Broadway in the musical Fly By Night as "Mr McClam" from May to June 2014.

He appeared Off-Broadway in the world premiere of The Treasurer at Playwrights Horizons as The Son, for which he was nominated for a 2018 Lucille Lortel Award for Best Actor.

Film and television
On television, Friedman starred as George Silver in Brooklyn Bridge (1991–1993) and has made numerous guest appearances in such series as Miami Vice, NYPD Blue, Without a Trace, Ghost Whisperer, The Affair and Damages, and the miniseries Perfect Murder, Perfect Town: JonBenét and the City of Boulder. He appeared in a Law & Order episode titled "Attorney Client" as defense lawyer Harold Jensen, broadcast on May 8, 2002.

Early in his career he performed in several episodes of The Muppet Show in its first and third seasons, and spent a brief time on Sesame Street. He has appeared in several HBO series such as High Maintenance and Succession, being a series regular in the latter.

Friedman's many feature film credits include Prince of the City (1981), Daniel (1983), The Seventh Sign (1988), Single White Female (1992), Blink (1994), I'm Not Rappaport (1996), I Shot Andy Warhol (1996),Paycheck (2003), Freedomland (2006), The Savages (2007), I'm Not There (2007), and Breaking Upwards (2009). Of his role in Safe, the All Movie Guide reviewer wrote: Avid filmgoers and adherents to the indie film movement that swept through America in the early to mid-'90s will invariably remember Peter Friedman as the sneaky, underhanded, New Age-espousing "self-help guru" who supposedly attempts to offer ailing Julianne Moore a hand up -- but only succeeds in draining her wallet -- in Todd Haynes' harrowing drama Safe (1995). In truth, that role represented just one of many memorable cinematic contributions for the prolific, highly versatile character actor, whose resumé reads like a best-of list of both independent film and Hollywood product.

Personal life
In 1990, Friedman married Joan Allen. Though they divorced in 2002, they chose to live close to one another in order to share time with their daughter, Sadie (born February 1994).

References

External links
 
 Peter Friedman at the Internet Off-Broadway Database
 

1949 births
American male film actors
American male stage actors
American male television actors
Hofstra University alumni
Male actors from New York City
Living people
20th-century American male actors
21st-century American male actors